Defcon 5 is a 1987 video game by Cosmi, created by Paul Norman. It was released first for the Commodore 64, and then ported to the Amiga and DOS.

Gameplay
Defcon 5 is a game which is set during the Cold War era.

Reception
In 1996, Computer Gaming World declared Defcon 5 the 2nd-worst computer game ever released. Advanced Computer Entertainment thought the game was "one of the less impressive offerings in the current Cosmi range"; despite the "sharp digitised graphics" it was said to "fall short in the playability stakes."

Reviews
ASM (Aktueller Software Markt) - Jan, 1989
ACE (Advanced Computer Entertainment) (Mar, 1989)

References

1987 video games
Amiga games
Cold War video games
Commodore 64 games
Cosmi Corporation games
DOS games
Simulation video games
Video games developed in the United States